UK HealthCare is the health care system that is based on the campus of the University of Kentucky (UK) in Lexington, Kentucky. It consists of the university's hospitals, clinics, outreach locations, and patient care services along with UKs health profession colleges.

Colleges

 College of Dentistry
 College of Health Sciences
 College of Medicine
 College of Nursing
 College of Pharmacy
 College of Public Health

Hospitals

 Albert B. Chandler Hospital: The 945 bed medical facility is UK HealthCare's flagship facility and includes numerous components to the University of Kentucky medical system. A new patient care facility is currently under construction.
 Eastern State Hospital: This 239 bed psychiatric hospital is owned by the Commonwealth of Kentucky and operated by UK HealthCare since 2014 under a $43 million contract with the Kentucky Cabinet for Health and Family Services. 
 Good Samaritan Hospital 
 Kentucky Children's Hospital
 King's Daughters Medical Center: A 465 bed medical facility in Ashland that was purchased by the University of Kentucky in December 2022.

Clinics and centers

 Student Health Facility: This building houses University Health Services.
 Center for Advanced Surgery
 Centers of Excellence: This includes the Centers for Rural Health, Critical Care Centers, the Sanders-Brown Center on Aging among numerous other units.
 Gill Heart Institute: This houses clinics, diagnostic areas, six Cath and EP laboratories and numerous offices. It is the home of the University of Kentucky Hospital Center for Advanced Surgery.
 Kentucky Clinic
 Kentucky Neuroscience Institute
 Markey Cancer Center

Academic buildings

 Biomedical Biological Science Research Building: This features workstations for laboratory technical staffing, offices, animal care areas, central autoclave facilities, centrifuge rooms, cold rooms and tissue and cell culture facilities for the College of Medicine, College of Pharmacy, and College of Arts and Sciences.
 Charles T. Wethington Jr. Building: This features numerous classrooms, offices and teaching laboratories for the College of Health Sciences.
 Biological Pharmaceutical Complex Building: This building has housed the College of Pharmacy since 2010.

References

External links
 University of Kentucky Medical Center Oral History Collection at the Louie B. Nunn Center for Oral History

Healthcare in Kentucky
Buildings at the University of Kentucky
Medical and health organizations based in Kentucky